Troy Independent School District is a public school district based in Troy, Texas (USA).

Located in Bell County, the district extends into a small portion of Falls County. In addition to Troy, the district also serves the unincorporated communities of Pendleton, Belfalls, and Oenaville.

In 2009, the school district was rated "academically acceptable" by the Texas Education Agency.

Schools
Troy High School (Grades 9-12)
Raymond Mays Middle School (Grades 6-8)
Troy Elementary School (Grades 2-5)
Mays Elementary School (Grades PK-1)

References

External links
Troy ISD

School districts in Bell County, Texas
School districts in Falls County, Texas